(Norwegian and Danish), also known as  (Nynorsk) and  (Swedish), is a Norwegian porridge made with sour cream, whole milk, wheat flour, butter, and salt.

 is a Norwegian word meaning sour cream;  translates as 'porridge'. Traditionally,  is a delicacy prepared for special occasions, including holidays. It is considered to be a traditional Norwegian dish. Recipes differ depending on the region of the country.

 is thick and sweet and is generally drizzled in butter and sprinkled with sugar and ground cinnamon.  Because this is so rich, it is often served in small cups with a small amount of butter topped with brown sugar, cinnamon and cream. Traditionally, it is eaten with cured meat.

In popular media, the children's book What's in the ? was written in 2020 by Norwegian-American author Carol Hagen. The storyline is based on a grandmother making the dish with her granddaughter, and includes a recipe.

In Westby, Wisconsin, a city that celebrates its Norwegian heritage, there is an annual  eating contest.

See also 
 List of porridges

References

Other sources 
Brown, Dale The Cooking of Scandinavia  (Time-Life Books, New York. 1968)
Haug, Tore and Astrid Karlsen Scott Authentic Norwegian Cooking (Nordic Adventures,  2000) 

Norwegian cuisine
Cuisine of the Midwestern United States
Christmas food
Cuisine of Minnesota
Cuisine of Wisconsin
Puddings
Porridges